The 2004 FIBA Africa Under-18 Championship for Women was the 8th FIBA Africa Under-18 Championship for Women, played under the rules of FIBA, the world governing body for basketball, and the FIBA Africa thereof. The tournament was hosted by Tunisia from December 17 to 26, 2004.

Tunisia ended the round-robin tournament with a 6–0 unbeaten record to win their first title  and qualify, alongside DR Congo, for the 2005 FIBA U19 Women's World Cup.

Participating teams

Squads

Schedule

Final standings 

Tunisia rosterEmna Jlida, Fatma Jouini, Fatma Mahmoud, Hajer Hafsi, Mariem Ouertani, Maroua Boumenjel, Mouna Ghalleb, Nedra Dhouibi, Olfa Ouerghi, Samah Grioui, Saousen Jebali, Selma M'Nasria, Coach:

Awards

See also
 2005 FIBA Africa Championship for Women

External links
Official Website

References

2004 FIBA Africa Under-18 Championship for Women
2004 FIBA Africa Under-18 Championship for Women
FIBA Africa Under-18 Championship for Women
2004 in youth sport
FIBA